The 1911 St. Louis Browns season involved the Browns finishing 8th in the American League with a record of 45 wins and 107 losses.

Regular season

Season standings

Record vs. opponents

Notable transactions 
 June 1911: Joe Willis was purchased from the Browns by the St. Louis Cardinals.

Roster

Player stats

Batting

Starters by position 
Note: Pos = Position; G = Games played; AB = At bats; H = Hits; Avg. = Batting average; HR = Home runs; RBI = Runs batted in

Other batters 
Note: G = Games played; AB = At bats; H = Hits; Avg. = Batting average; HR = Home runs; RBI = Runs batted in

Pitching

Starting pitchers 
Note: G = Games pitched; IP = Innings pitched; W = Wins; L = Losses; ERA = Earned run average; SO = Strikeouts

Other pitchers 
Note: G = Games pitched; IP = Innings pitched; W = Wins; L = Losses; ERA = Earned run average; SO = Strikeouts

Relief pitchers 
Note: G = Games pitched; W = Wins; L = Losses; SV = Saves; ERA = Earned run average; SO = Strikeouts

Notes

References 
1911 St. Louis Browns team page at Baseball Reference
1911 St. Louis Browns season at baseball-almanac.com

St. Louis Browns seasons
Saint Louis Browns season
1911 in sports in Missouri